Lino Emerido Elías Ocaña (born 16 March 1966) is a Cuban weightlifter. He competed in the men's light heavyweight event at the 1992 Summer Olympics.

Elías Ocaña won weightlifting gold at the 1993 Central American and Caribbean Games in Puerto Rico. Following the games, he defected to the United States with at least 30 other Cuban athletes.

References

1966 births
Living people
Cuban male weightlifters
Olympic weightlifters of Cuba
Weightlifters at the 1992 Summer Olympics
Central American and Caribbean Games medalists in weightlifting
Place of birth missing (living people)
20th-century Cuban people
21st-century Cuban people